Tropical Airways Flight 1301 (TBG1301/M71301) was a domestic short-haul passenger flight, flying from Hugo Chávez International Airport in Cap-Haïtien, Haiti to the commune of Port-de-Paix which crashed onto a sugarcane field less than 10 minutes after take off on the evening of 24 August 2003. The aircraft was a 19-seater Let L-410 Turbolet carrying 19 passengers and 2 crew. Witnesses stated that the aircraft caught fire during take-off and exploded  when it hit the ground. All on board were killed.

The crash is currently the second deadliest aircraft crash in Haiti and the second worst accident involving a Let L-410 Turbolet, after Sakha Avia Flight 301. The Haitian investigative board stated that multiple factors caused the crash, one of which was an opened cargo door during mid-flight. The pilots were struggling to return  to the airport. Subsequent poor CRM (Crew resource management) contributed to the crash.

Flight
The flight was a daily domestic flight operated by Tropical Airways, the national airline of Haiti at the time. The airline was authorized to operate by the Ministry of Commerce of the Republic of Haiti on 1 June 1998. The National Civil Aviation Office issued the license of operation on 12 February 1999  The flight was operated by a Let L-410UVP-E3 registered as HH-PRV and was carrying 19 passengers and 2 crews. All except the crew were Haitians; the Captain was an American and the co-pilot was Spanish. It was flying from Cap-Haïtien, the capital of the Department of Nord on the north coast of Haiti to Port-de-Paix, the capital of the Nord-Ouest department.

Flight 1301 took off from Runway 05 of Hugo Chávez International Airport at around 04:50 p.m local time. During  take off, ATC workers at the control tower spotted that the cargo door opened. While the controller was preparing to tell Flight 1301 about the problem, the crew  asked permission to return to the airport to land. Permission was granted and the flight was asked to make a right rear wind landing. The aircraft turned to the left, crashed, skidded and exploded, followed by a rising thick black smoke. All 21 people on board were killed. Most of them were charred beyond recognition.

Investigation
The flight was neither equipped with a CVR nor a FDR and therefore the investigation relied on the wreckage of the aircraft and the air traffic controller recording.
A number of components were extracted from the wreckage for analysis. The propellers were examined by a delegation sent by the manufacturer Avia Hamilton and the Czech Civil Aviation. Investigators revealed that these propellers were still rotating with a high number of turns at impact and none of them were in the flag position after impact. The position of the flaps (tlaps) was also analyzed. Investigative commission stated that the flaps were in "full down" 42° position.

The controller stated that after the crew reported the problem on the cargo door and conducted a turn to the airport, the pilot seems to have the aircraft under control. The controller stated that the plane could have made it to the airport. However, the altitude of the aircraft was much lower than a normal approach altitude.

The Let L-410 manufacturer's test pilot's report mentions the following: "In a flight configuration (right turn at low altitude) where the weight was either excessive or at the maximum limit, the flaps extended to maximum (42° full down); this situation could significantly reduce the speed of the aircraft. During the turn, the rudder could be in an uncoordinated position and the engines generate an asymmetric thrust." The combination of these factors could critically increase the drag caused the plane to enter a stall condition. In the examination of the carcass of the engines, there is no evidence that a fire broke out before impact.

Investigative team could not determine the total weight of Flight 1301 since there was no documents about the weight of the aircraft and the cargo.

The Captain's record indicated that he was qualified and had passed the flight proficiency test in accordance with the applicable rules. It indicated that during the three months prior to the accident, he worked normally according to a 7/7 schedule, that is to say 7 days of work
followed by 7 days of rest. However, the Committee noted that during the month of August, the month in which the accident occurred, that schedule had been interrupted. From August 9 to 24, the Captain was overworked and was possibly sleep deprived due to this. Haitian investigators then stated that the Captain could have been fatigued during the crash.

Conclusion
Haitian investigators then published the cause of the accident as stall during approach phase while on the downwind leg caused by the loss of VMC at low altitude.

Contributing factors were:
 failure of the crew to manage the approach procedure (Poor CRM)
 use of maximum flaps (42°)
 insufficient altitude
 lack of coordination between crew members
 possible state of fatigue of the captain
 possible excess weight
 opening of the baggage hold door, observed during takeoff.

See also
 Turkish Airlines Flight 981 - cargo door blew up in mid-flight

References

External links
 Accident description, Aviation Safety Network

Aviation accidents and incidents in 2003
Aviation accidents and incidents in Haiti
Airliner accidents and incidents caused by pilot error
2003 in Haiti
August 2003 events in North America
Accidents and incidents involving the Let L-410 Turbolet